{{safesubst:#invoke:RfD||2=Star Life|month = February
|day = 28
|year = 2023
|time = 08:50
|timestamp = 20230228085024

|content=
REDIRECT Disney Star

}}